You Disappear is a 2017 Danish drama film directed by Peter Schønau Fog. The film was based on Christian Jungersen's novel by the same name. It was screened in the Special Presentations section at the 2017 Toronto International Film Festival. It was selected as the Danish entry for the Best Foreign Language Film at the 90th Academy Awards, but it was not nominated.

Plot
Frederik is diagnosed with a brain tumor that can cause behaviour disturbances. His wife Mia questions what kind of man he is, especially when it's discovered he is embezzling from the school he headmasters.

Cast
 Trine Dyrholm as Mia Halling
 Nikolaj Lie Kaas as Frederik Halling
 Michael Nyqvist as Bernard Berman
 Sofus Rønnov as Niklas Halling
 Mikkel Følsgaard as Prosecutor
 Emilie Koppel as Emilie

Reception
On review aggregator website Rotten Tomatoes, the film has an approval rating of 36% based on 11 reviews, and an average rating of 5.2/10.

See also
 List of submissions to the 90th Academy Awards for Best Foreign Language Film
 List of Danish submissions for the Academy Award for Best Foreign Language Film

References

External links
 

2017 films
2017 drama films
Danish drama films
2010s Danish-language films
Films based on Danish novels